The Harlem Artists Guild (1935–41) was an African-American organization founded by artists including Augusta Savage, Charles Alston, Elba Lightfoot, Louise E. Jefferson and bibliophile Arthur Schomburg with the aims of encouraging young talent, providing a forum for the discussion of the visual arts in the community, fostering understanding between artists and the public through education towards an appreciation of art, focusing on issues of general concern to Black artists such as racism, poverty and unemployment, and cooperating with agencies to improve conditions and raise standards of living and achievement among African-American artists. It is said to have had its origins in the dissatisfaction of African-American artists with the activities of the Harmon Foundation, and was described by co-founder Alston as "a pressure group to get more black artists on the federal projects."

History
Formed in early 1935 by artists including Augusta Savage, Charles Alston and Elba Lightfoot, the Harlem Artists Guild (HAG) had headquarters on 136th Street, New York. HAG strategies included pressurizing the Federal Arts Project of the Works Progress Administration to accept more African-American participants. The constitution on the Guild stated in part: "We, the artists of Harlem, being aware of the need to act collectively in the solution of the cultural, economic, social and professional problems that confront us, do hereby constitute ourselves an organization that shall be known as the Harlem Artists Guild." Members included Romare Bearden, Gwendolyn Bennett, Aaron Douglas, Norman Lewis, and some others; by 1937 the membership had grown to about 90 and the Guild was putting on exhibitions that included Jacob Lawrence.

From discussions among HAG artists about the necessity for, and ways to bring about, the establishment of a permanent art center for Harlem came the idea for the Harlem Community Art Center, which opened at the end of 1937, and of which Gwendolyn Bennett was Director from 1938 to 1941. The Harlem Artists Guild became an integral part of the Center, holding its meetings there and shows by members.

Further reading
 Calo, Mary Ann (October 2005). "A Community Art Center for Harlem: The Cultural Politics of 'Negro Art' Initiatives in the Early 20th Century". Prospects, Vol. 29, 155–183. doi:10.1017/S0361233300001721. Cambridge University Press.

References

1935 establishments in New York City
African-American arts organizations
African-American cultural history
American artist groups and collectives
Arts organizations based in New York City
Arts organizations established in 1935
Harlem
African-American culture